Haugr is a Norse name and landform name deriving from the noun  meaning hill, knoll, hollow, or mound. When used in English contexts, it may refer to a tumulus, or barrow.

Haugr may also refer to:

Surnames
 Haugan (name), a derivation of "Haugr"
 Hauge, a derivation of "Haugr"
 Haugen (surname), a derivation of "Haugr"
 Haugland (name), a derivation of "Haugr"
 Howe (surname), a derivation of "Haugr"

References

See also

 
 Haugan (disambiguation)
 Hauge (disambiguation)
 Haugen (disambiguation)
 Haugland (disambiguation)
 Howe (disambiguation)